Alexandra Lytton Regalado is an Salvadoran-American author, translator, and poet. Her book Relinquenda, won the National Poetry Series. Her book. Matria, won the St. Lawrence Book Award. She is a CantoMundo fellow, Ahe won a Coniston prize.

Life 
She graduated from Florida International University, and Pacific University.

She co-founded Kalina publishing. Alexandra edited and translated Vanishing Points: Contemporary Salvadoran Prose (2017).

She is chief editor at lapisuchamagazine.com; she is assistant editor at Supporting Women Writers in Miami.

Her work appeared in Bomb.

Works 

 Relinquenda, Beacon Press, 2022. 
 Matria, Black Lawrence Press, 2017. 
 La Medusa, and: La Doña, Cream City Review, 2016.

References

External links 

 Official website
 A Conversation with Alexandra Lytton Regalado sinkingcity.as.miami.edu

Date of birth missing (living people)
Living people
American poets
American translators
Year of birth missing (living people)